Carver Theatre is a historic African American movie theater in Columbia, South Carolina. It was built in 1941, and is a two-story, rectangular, brick commercial building.  It has a flat roof and a vertical marquee.  It operated as a movie theater until 1971.

It was listed on the National Register of Historic Places in 2003.

References

African-American history of South Carolina
Theatres on the National Register of Historic Places in South Carolina
Theatres completed in 1941
Buildings and structures in Columbia, South Carolina
National Register of Historic Places in Columbia, South Carolina